Reform means the improvement or amendment of what is wrong, corrupt, unsatisfactory, etc. The use of the word in this way emerges in the late 18th century and is believed to originate from Christopher Wyvill's Association movement which identified “Parliamentary Reform” as its primary aim. Reform is generally regarded as antithetical to revolution.

Developing countries may carry out a wide range of reforms to improve their living standards, often with support from international financial institutions and aid agencies. This can include reforms to macroeconomic policy, the civil service, and public financial management.

In the United States, rotation in office or term limits would, by contrast, be more revolutionary, in altering basic political connections between incumbents and constituents.

Re-form
When used to describe something which is physically formed again, such as re-casting (mold/mould) or a band that gets back together, the proper term is re-form (with a hyphen), not "reform".

See also 
 Catalytic reforming
 Education reform
 Electoral reform
 Land reform
 Microeconomic reform
 Monetary reform
 Progressivism
 Reform (Religion)
 Reform movement
 Reformism
 Security sector governance and reform
 Tax reform
 University reform
 Wall Street reform

Notes

References

Further reading

 Harrington, Mona. The Dream of Deliverance in American Politics. New York: A.A. Knopf, 1986. x, 308 p. 

 
18th-century neologisms